Khalifa Ezzat was born in Bani Sweif, south of Egypt  where he first received his Islamic education in the local Al-Fahsn Institute of Al Azhar located in Al-Fashin City.  It was the custom of the Saft Al-Urafa community, to enrol the able and bright students for Qur'anic memorisation. Khalifa, began memorising the Qur'an,  from his teachers Sheikh Husain, then his son Sheikh Muhammad, then Sheikh Sayyed Othman.

Khalifa completed the memorisation of the Qur'an, at early age. As part of, his prep and secondary school at Al-Azhar in Al Fashn; his early academic life, predominately composed of learning major traditional Islamic doctrines, including, Tafsir, Hadith, Arabic language, Shariah/Fiqh, and Theology. After successfully completing his secondary education, he was nominated and enrolled in Al Azhar University in Cairo to complete his Islamic education.

Education

Khalifa studied at one of the oldest Islamic Institutions in the world, Al Azhar University, Cairo from 1994 to 1999. He was awarded a BA Islamic Studies in English, Faculty of Languages and Translation in 1999. As part of his degree programme, he also studied English and German. After this, he pursued his career as an Imam in Cairo in 2000. When he moved to the United Kingdom in 2005, he completed his master's degree in Islamic studies at the School of African and Oriental Studies (SOAS), where he received his MA Islamic Studies. Khalifa was also awarded a PhD from the University of Exeter: his thesis title was ''People of the Book, An Analytical Study of Jews and Christians in the Qur’an.

Chief Imam and Head of Religious Affairs at London Central Mosque

In 2005, Khalifa was nominated by the Egyptian Ministry of Endowments (Awqaf) to be appointed as an Imam of London Central Mosque and Islamic Cultural Centre; in 2008, he was appointed as the Head Imam of the Mosque. In his current role as Imam, he leads the faithful Muslims in congregational prayer, delivers Friday sermons, gives lectures and lessons for Muslims and Non-Muslims, and manages the religious affairs department at the London Cultural Centre. His main weekly class is the Islamic Studies Class for Beginners (Muslims and non-Muslims). In addition, Khalifa provides an advice service, that includes marital and one to one counselling, marriage, divorce and conversion registrations.

Services

For the past decade, Khalifa has provided community service to many visitors at London Central Mosque. He has a successful track record of mediating between married couples and delivering effective counselling. In addition to Islamic marriage (Nikkah), divorce (Talaq), and conversion procedures, he offers registrations, with certificates both in English and Arabic. He also provides an advisory service on personal religious matters, which includes: inheritance, conversion, social and familial issues. The listed services are available to all members of the British and International community.

Khalifa also supports the newly converted to Islam and born Muslims seeking to renew their faith. He delivers regular easy to understand Islamic classes, every Sunday at 4pm in the Mosque Library.

He covers a variety of topics in Islam, such as Introduction to the Concept of God, the Qur'an, Hadith (Muhammad Sayings), Life of Muhammad (in Makkah), Life of Muhammad (in Madina), Sunnah (Muhammad Way), the Exegesis of the Qur'an (Tafsir), Fiqh (Jurisprudence), the Shariah Islamic Law, The Objectives of the Shariah, Introduction to School of Thoughts (Abu Hanifa- Malik- Shafi - Ibn Hanbal), Marriage in Islam, Terrorism: Islamic Viewpoint, Extremism in Religion, The Concept of Worship, Sins and Repentance in Islam, Introduction to Tawheed (Monotheism). These classes are available to anyone seeking to understand Islam (with free entry).

Friday sermons

The Friday Speech is considered one of the special features of the Friday prayer. Khalifa takes a contemporary and practical approach in the Friday sermons, which he regularly delivers at Regents Park Mosque. The topics which he has covered thus far, include issues which effect the Muslim's on both an individual and communal level. The Friday sermons also, serve as important reminders for the congregation, of the Muslim's duty to their Creator and responsibility towards others.  The Mosque, attracts many crowds and is a perfect opportunity for the Imam's to address the mass on contemporary issues. The speech, attended by around four thousand people men and women), is delivered in Arabic and English and lasts for 30 minutes.

The objective of the speeches is to encourage people to engage in activities that bring benefit to themselves and others and to avoid all that God has ordained to be avoided, to remember and glorify God alone as the Creator of all, to follow the example of Muhammad, to tackle current issues that affect the Muslim community, to inform and highlight to the people the importance of peace, coexistence, tolerance, and respecting the law of the land that they are living in.

The following are links to these sermons in written  and recorded format.

LCM welcomes other Muslim faith leaders to download and use Khalifa's Friday sermon speeches in their own congregation.

Conferences and seminars

Khalifa participates in many conferences and seminars, for Da'wah and shedding light on Islam. In a recent event, he led an initiative to encourage non-Muslims to visit London Central Mosque, which included members of the Abrahamic faith.

As well as addressing issues closer to the Muslim community, his participation as an active member, to promote unity, and shielding against extremism, has made him a valuable asset to this cause.

Interfaith activities

Khalifa has participated in numerous seminars and conferences, building understanding and bridges between the Abrahamic faiths.

In 2012, as part of an interfaith meeting, Khalifa and members of the Jewish and Christian community joined by the Duke of York, publicised developing the values of respect and tolerance that are close to the heart of the royal family.

Khalifa participates in the annual interfaith weeks. In November 2016, Khalifa took part alongside 150 faith leaders from 12 different faiths, members of parliament and embassy representatives promoting the free practice of faith, forgiveness, humility, kindness and compassion.

In June 2017, Khalifa was the opening speaker in an interfaith Iftar at London Central Mosque welcoming more than 130 representatives from 12 faiths and religious sects, the Metropolitan Police, members of parliament and community leaders. They stood in solidarity, remembering recent incidents, including those at Manchester Arena, London Bridge, Finsbury Park Mosque and Grenfell Tower. They were remembered and he stressed the importance of all faiths to work together in order to prevent innocent people being misled into violence and hatred.

International ventures

Khalifa, alongside nine members of the Council of Imams and Rabbis, visited Srebrenica in commemoration of the genocide of 1995 which killed 8,372 Bosnisan Muslims. In this visit, Khalifa was spreading the message of tolerance and coexistence.

In November 2017, Sultan Bello Mosque issued an official invitation to Khalifa to Nigeria. During his visit to four main cities in Nigeria, he met with Muslim leaders including the Grand Mufti and His Royal Highness the Emir of Kano.  He also met with Officials and governors of some states.

Collaborations

Khalifa was one of the Muslim leaders who welcomed the Grand Imam of Al-Azhar Dr Ahmad El Tayeb in a reception arranged by the Archbishop of Canterbury Justin Welby.
  
He was also one of the Muslim leaders who welcomed Dr. Sheikh Abdul Rahman Al-Sudais, head of the Office of the Presidency of the Grand Mosques of Makkah and the Prophet's Mosque in Madinah in July 2016, when he visited the London Central Mosque. Al-Sudais delivered a speech which Khalifa translated.

Khalifa plays a part in the Islamic Shari'a Council's role in tackling religious issues and solving matrimonial problems. He is also a member on the Major Mosques of London Committee.

Media appearances

He has appeared as a guest on many TV channels such as the BBC and Sky News. In his speech following the March 2017 attack on Westminster, he emphasised the importance of not linking such acts of terrorism to Islam, how the principles of Islam have no room for manoeuvre for any acts of violence, how methods of divide will not succeed and the paramount importance of remaining united together.  An article has also been published by the BBC documenting this Television appearance.

Publications

He has written a number of articles including:

•	The Penal Law in the Qur'an: Analytical Study for Sūrat Al-Mā’idah and An-Nūr

•	Closing the Gate of Ijtihād

•	Woman in the Qur'an

•	The Notion of Maṣlaḥah in the Western Literature

•	Analytical Study to Sūrat Yusuf.

Khalifa has contributed to the translation from Arabic to English of Islamic books, address contemporary issues and religious practices. Published in Cairo and London, these include:

•	Freedom of Belief in Islamic Law

•	Islam and Love

•	Islam and sex

•	Islam - the Law of Life

•	Salah Ad-Din

•	How the Prophet Offered Prayer [Ibn Baz]

•	Fortification of the Muslim

•	Invocations from the Qur'an and Sunnah

•	Allah

•	The Messenger

•	Misconceptions about Islam [Ministry of Awqaf of Egypt]

•	Human Rights and Racial Discrimination in Islam

•	Hajj and ‘Umrah

•	Forty Nawawī Hadiths.

Khalifa has also authored a number of his own works, including:

•	A Brief Guide to the Principles of Tajweed [Published in London by ICC]

•	Inheritance Law of Islam [in press]

•	A Guide to Prayer.

•	A selection of his Friday sermons (khutbas) can also be found online [in press].

Awards

Award from UmmulKhair Foundation in Nigeria for serving Muslim and Non-Muslim community 2017.
BISCA British Imams and scholar’s contribution and achievement 2016. ‘Outstanding contribution to interfaith week’ 
Awarded by Essex Jamme Masjid in appreciation for all services and dedication to the Muslim community Essex Jamme Masjid 15 April 2014

External links

Khalifa meets Prince Andrew. 

Khalifa meets GB Olympic Team 2012. 

Khalifa participating in the Love of Faith Walk. 

Khalifa delivering Friday sermon. 

Khalifa is a member of the Council of Imams and Rabbis which made visit to Srebrenica. 

Khalifa joined Faith Leaders to condemn 'appalling attack' 

Khalifa joined St Paul's joins nation in minute's silence for Manchester

References

Year of birth missing (living people)
Living people
Egyptian imams
Al-Azhar University alumni
Alumni of SOAS University of London